Antonio Laudelino Souza-Kordeiru (born 21 March 1993) is a retired Russian pair skater. Skating with Lana Petranović for Croatia, he has competed in the final segment at four European Championships.

Personal life 
Souza-Kordeiru was born on 21 March 1993 in Moscow, Russia. His mother is Russian and his father is from Portugal.

Skating career

Early years 
Souza-Kordeiru began learning to skate in 2000. He skated in partnership with Evgenia Kazantseva before teaming up with Arina Cherniavskaia. Representing Russia, Cherniavskaia/Souza-Kordeiru made their international debut in November 2012, taking the junior bronze medal at the Warsaw Cup.

2013–2014 season 
In August 2013, Cherniavskaia/Souza-Kordeiru appeared at their first ISU Junior Grand Prix (JGP) event. Coached by Arina Ushakova and Andrei Hekalo in Moscow, they placed 5th at the 2013 JGP in Riga, Latvia, and then won silver at their next JGP assignment, which took place in October in Ostrava, Czech Republic.

2014–2015 season 
Cherniavskaia/Souza-Kordeiru moved up to the senior level, coached by Ushakova. Making their Grand Prix debut, the pair placed eighth at the 2014 Cup of China in November. Later that month, they competed at the 2014 CS Ice Challenge and 2014 CS Warsaw Cup, finishing fourth at both events, but withdrew from their second Grand Prix assignment, the 2014 NHK Trophy. They placed eighth at the 2015 Russian Championships.

2015–2016 season 
In October, Cherniavskaia/Souza-Kordeiru finished fourth at the 2015 CS Mordovian Ornament. It was their final international together. The pair did not compete at the 2016 Russian Championships.

In 2016, Croatia's Lana Petranović arrived in Moscow in search of a skating partner. She and Souza-Kordeiru teamed up in spring 2016 to compete for Croatia.

2016–2017 season 
Making their international debut as a team, Petranović/Souza-Kordeiru placed fourth at the 2016 CS Warsaw Cup in November. They finished fifth at the 2016 CS Golden Spin of Zagreb in December; 15th at the 2017 European Championships in January in Ostrava, Czech Republic; and 21st at the 2017 World Championships in March in Helsinki, Finland. They were coached by Yuri Larionov in Moscow.

2017–2018 season 
Petranović underwent an operation after injuring the meniscus in her knee and returned to the ice after three months. Due to her injury, the pair was unable to compete in September at the 2017 CS Nebelhorn Trophy, which served as the final qualification opportunity for the 2018 Winter Olympics. They returned to competition in January, placing 12th at the 2018 European Championships in Moscow. In March, they placed 21st at the 2018 World Championships in Milan, Italy. They were coached by Larionov and Dmitri Savin in Moscow.

2018–2019 season 
Coached by Savin in Moscow, Petranović/Souza-Kordeiru placed seventh at their first event of the season, the 2018 CS Lombardia Trophy. They competed at two other Challenger events of the season, the 2018 CS Nebelhorn Trophy and 2018 CS Golden Spin of Zagreb, placing eighth and seventh.  They finished the season placing eighth at the 2019 European Championships and sixteenth at the 2019 World Championships.

2019–2020 season 
Petranović/Souza-Kordeiru placed twelfth at the 2019 CS Golden Spin of Zagreb and fifteenth at the 2020 European Championships.  The 2020 World Championships were cancelled as a result of the COVID-19 pandemic.

2020–2021 season 
Petranović/Souza-Kordeiru placed twenty-first at the 2021 World Championships.

2021–2022 season 
Petranović/Souza-Kordeiru began the season at the 2021 CS Nebelhorn Trophy, seeking to qualify a berth at the 2022 Winter Olympics. They placed twelfth, outside of qualification. They went on to finish sixth at the Budapest Trophy and eleventh at the 2021 CS Golden Spin of Zagreb, and then sixteenth at the 2022 European Championships.

In February, he announced his retirement from competitive figure skating.

Programs

With Petranović

With Cherniavskaia

Competitive highlights 
GP: Grand Prix; CS: Challenger Series; JGP: Junior Grand Prix

With Petranović for Croatia

With Cherniavskaia for Russia

References

External links 

 
 

1993 births
Croatian figure skaters
Russian male pair skaters
Living people
Figure skaters from Moscow
Russian people of Portuguese descent
Croatian people of Russian descent
Croatian people of Portuguese descent